Yozgat is a city and the capital district of Yozgat Province in the Central Anatolia Region of Turkey. According to 2019 census, population of the district is 421,200 of which 106,280 live in the city of Yozgat.

History

The first surveys were started in the year 1993. Since then archaeologists have uncovered countless artifacts belonging to 5 different ancient civilizations from the area and as well as artifacts that belong to 5 different eras – the Bronze, Hellenistic, Hittite, Copper and Upper Byzantine eras.

Surface excavations and surveys were also undertaken on the Kerkenes plateau by Dr. Geoffery Summers, a British archaeologist. The plateau is believed to be the home to the lost city of Pteria. The search for this lost city as well as other old world constructions began in 2013, and it plans to go on till the month of August as well. The expedition covers an area which is surrounded by walls and is known to date back to almost 2600 years.

According to historical reports, Pteria was destroyed, burned and abandoned during the Battle of Pteria between the Lydians and the Medes. This battle ended during a solar eclipse on 28 May 585 BC, and it was understood to be an omen that the gods wanted the fighting to stop.

Another excavation site in the region that deserves to be mentioned is in Kusaklu Tumulus. A team headed by Dr. Stefania Mazzoni has been working at the site since the year 2008, and it is believed that the Hittite civilization as well as the city of Zippalandawas once existed in the region. As a part of these excavations a 2000-year-old Roman bath that was said to be used to heal people from their wounds has been discovered. Traces of the Roman, Seljuq, Byzantine and Ottoman eras have also been found in the region.

With so much of history yet to be uncovered from a single city, archaeologists remain hopeful of unearthing many more wonders of the ancient world in the next few months. It has already been proved that the area was home to numerous civilizations that date all the way back to the Roman era. Archaeologists remain hopeful of managing to unearth many more old world structures and secrets as time passes by.

After the old administrative center of the region, Tavium (Büyüknefes), became ruined, a new centre was created by Çapanoğlu, the founder of a powerful derebey family and called Bozok.

Ottoman era 
The Ottoman Empire annexed Yozgat in 1398. At around 1911, it was the chief town of a sanjak of the same name in the Ankara Vilayet. There was a trade in yellow madder (Stil de grain yellow) and mohair. The sanjak was very fertile, and contained good breeding-grounds in which cattle, horses and even camels were reared for the local agriculture and foreign trade.

Yozgat was the site of a prisoner of war camp in the First World War, holding British and Empire officers captured at the Siege of Kut, including E. H. Jones and C. W. Hill, whose escape attempts were recounted in the book The Road to En-dor.

Geography
The town is located at an elevation of 4,380 ft (1,335 m), situated 105 mi (170 km) east of Ankara, near the head of a narrow valley through which the Ankara–Sivas road runs. Like much of the Anatolian Plateau, the lands around Yozgat have been deforested over thousands of years of human habitation. This makes the climate and weather harsh, in summers and winters. However, Turkey has taken great steps to reforest at least some of the region.

Climate
Yozgat has a continental climate (Köppen: Dsb, Trewartha: Dc) with cold, snowy winters and warm, dry summers. Hottest month averages at  during the day.

Sights

The main sights of the city of Yozgat are the Yozgat Clock Tower built in 1908 and the Çapanoğlu Mosque built by the Çapanoğlu family, who are the founders of Yozgat.

Sport

The city's football team Yozgatspor plays in the Turkish Regional Amateur League.

Notable people
 Agah Efendi (1832–1885), journalist, publisher of the first Turkish newspaper
 Nasuh Akar (1925–1984), Olympic gold medalist wrestler
 Celal Atik (1918–1979), Olympic gold medalist wrestler
 Bekir Bozdağ (1965), Deputy prime minister
 Cemil Çiçek (1946), Speaker of Turkish Grand National Assembly
 Aylin Daşdelen (1982), European champion female weightlifter
 John Ilhan (1965–2007), Turkish-Australian businessman
 Lütfullah Kayalar (1952), former Minister of Finance
 Soner Özbilen (1947), folk singer
 Bozoklu Mustafa Pasha (1693–1694), Ottoman Grand Vizier
 Yusuf Izzet Pasha (1876–1922), Ottoman and Turkish general
 Mehmet Topuz (1983), footballer
 Mehmet Nidâ Tüfekçi (1929–1993), folk singer
 Mehmet Yıldız (1981), footballer
 Nubar Ozanyan (1956-2017), Turkish-born Armenian communist
 Hayko Cepkin (1978), Rock Singer
 İhsan Oktay Anar (1960), Author

References

External links

 District governor's official website 



 
Districts of Yozgat Province